Urapidil is a sympatholytic antihypertensive drug. It acts as an α1-adrenoceptor antagonist and as an 5-HT1A receptor agonist. Although an initial report suggested that urapidil was also an α2-adrenoceptor agonist, this was not substantiated in later studies that demonstrated it was devoid of agonist actions in the dog saphenous vein and the guinea-pig ileum. Unlike some other α1-adrenoceptor antagonists, urapidil does not elicit reflex tachycardia, and this may be related to its weak β1-adrenoceptor antagonist activity, as well as its effect on cardiac vagal drive. Urapidil is currently not approved by the U.S. Food and Drug Administration, but it is available in Europe.

See also 
 Naftopidil

References 

5-HT1A agonists
Alpha-1 blockers
Beta blockers
Chemical substances for emergency medicine
N-(2-methoxyphenyl)piperazines
Lactams
Pyrimidines